Taiyuan Normal University is a university in Shanxi, China under the authority of the provincial government. Taiyuan Normal University is a teaching University. It provides graduates to fill China's growing need for primary, secondary and tertiary teachers.

Teachers colleges in China
Universities and colleges in Shanxi